1990 Baltic League was an international football competition organized in 1990 between three Baltic states with the ongoing dissolution of the Soviet Union. The league consisting of 18 clubs from the Lithuania SSR, Estonian SSR, the Latvian SSR and a special invitee FC Progress Cherniakhovsk from Kaliningrad Oblast. For Lithuanian teams the league also served as a preliminary (first stage) tournament for the first post-Soviet Lithuanian football championship.

With the ongoing revolutions of 1989, in 1990 the Baltic republics declared reinstatement of their independence and exit out of the Soviet Union. Lithuania declared its independence on March 11, on March 30 the Estonian Soviet Socialist Republic announced that its existence is not legal by recognizing itself as a territory under the Soviet occupation since 1940, Latvia simply repeated the feat of Lithuania on May 4.

The Lithuanian club Žalgiris, a member of the Soviet Top League after losing its first game in Odesa 0–1 to Chernomorets Odessa, withdrew from the 1990 Soviet Top League and joined the Baltic League. The club that in previous season qualified for the 1990–91 UEFA Cup was denied entrance to the European competitions.

History
The four best Lithuanian teams from Baltic League and the 1 Lyga qualified for the National Championship play-off. Also all Lithuanian clubs from the Baltic League qualified for the next season of A Lyga. Most of Latvian clubs also joined the championship of Latvia (Latvian SSR), while some continued their participation in the Soviet championship. The Soviet Estonian clubs after the fall of the Soviet Union were dissolved, while Progress Chernyakhovsk continued to participate in lower leagues of the Russian championship.

Note that Pardaugava also this season competed in the 1990 Soviet Second League (as Daugava Riga), while Zalgiris just pulled out of the Soviet competitions after playing the first game of the 1990 Soviet Top League, losing it away in Odessa. Also both Chernyakovsk and Yelgava clubs competed in the 1990 Soviet Second League B, Zone 6.

Teams

All-Union competition

Football championship of the Lithuanian SSR

Football championship of the Latvian SSR

Notes:
 RAF Jelgava was the second team of RAF Jelgava that was playing in the 1990 Soviet Second League B (Group 6).
 Daugava-LGIFK Riga was a reserve team of FC Daugava Riga that played in the 1990 Soviet First League. LGIFK stands for the Latvian State Institute of Physical Culture.
 RShVSM stands for the Republican School of Higher Sports Mastery.

Football championship of the Estonian SSR

Notes:
 Last season Fosforit Tallinn was known as Zvezda Tallinn representing the Soviet Army sports club

Football championship of the Russian SFSR (among KFK)

Withdrew
 Atlantas Klaipeda Soviet Second League, 8th place

Baltic League

 ASK Fosforit Tallinn quit the competition after 14 games

Top scorers
 18 V.Baranauskas (Sakalas Šiauliai)
 16 A.Narbekovas  (Zalgiris Vilnius)
 14 V.Ivanauskas  (Zalgiris Vilnius)
 14 K.Dranginis   (Inkaras Kaunas)

See also
 1990 Estonian SSR Football Championship
 1990 Latvian SSR Higher League
 1990 Lithuanian Top League

References
 united Baltic League
 Lithuanian League

External links
 В 1990-м клуб из Калининградской области играл в Балтийской лиге – с литовцами, латвийцами и эстонцами. Как так вышло?. www.sports.ru. 
 БАЛТИЙСКАЯ ЛИГА В ФУТБОЛЕ. ЗА И ПРОТИВ. betsafepribaltika.com. 1 October 2021

1990 in Lithuanian football
1990 in Latvian football
1990 in Estonian football
1990 in Russian football
Baltic League
1989–90 in European association football leagues
1990–91 in European association football leagues